Captain Morgan is a brand of flavored rums (including, in Europe, some rum-flavored "premium spirit drinks") produced by British alcohol conglomerate Diageo. It is named after the 17th-century Welsh privateer of the Caribbean, Sir Henry Morgan.

History
In 1984, Captain Morgan Original Spiced Rum was introduced to the United States. On 15 April 2005, Captain Morgan Tattoo Black Spiced rum and its mysterious 'sweet-to-heat' finish became the newest addition to the Captain Morgan Family. Captain Morgan was, by volume, the second largest brand of spirits in the United States, and the seventh largest worldwide in 2007. , 7.6 million 9-litre cases were sold. Most Captain Morgan rum is sold in the United States, Canada, Great Britain, South Africa, and Global Travel.

In November 2009, the NFL banned a covert ad campaign allegedly put on by Diageo. It was understood that for each NFL player striking the "Captain Morgan" pose on camera during a regular season game, Diageo would donate  to the Gridiron Greats (a non-profit which helps retired NFL players with various hardships after leaving the game). The league made this announcement following such a celebration by Brent Celek of the Philadelphia Eagles.

In 2010 two American territories, Puerto Rico and the United States Virgin Islands bickered over plans for Captain Morgan to move operations to the Virgin Islands for tax reasons. The matter came to a head during a debate in the United States Congress over the USVI's attempt to use tax benefits to lure the company to that territory.

In 2014, Diageo Canada filed a trade dress infringement lawsuit against Heaven Hill Distilleries Inc, claiming striking similarities between the Captain Morgan character and Admiral Nelson, and that the similarity would dilute the Captain Morgan trademark. Diageo Canada won the lawsuit in 2017.

In 2020, the brand launch a new product called Captain Morgan Tiki. This new pineapple mango flavor rum is available in the United Kingdom, Australia, the Czech Republic and Germany.

Varieties
White Rum – A five-times distilled rum that is aged in white oak barrels for over a year, and then filtered to remove the colour, except for the Atlantic Canadian market, where it retains a greenish tinge.
Dark Rum - A dark rum aged in oak
Spiced Gold - A spiced rum with a taste of vanilla and brown sugar
 Tiki – A limited edition rum with pineapple and mango flavors to pair with lemonade.

In popular culture
Before and after the 2015 SummerSlam event, John Cena used the brand as a nickname for Seth Rollins (the WWE World Heavyweight Champion) on WWE's Monday Night Raw show. In 2016, Diageo created special limited edition bottles to commemorate Wes Morgan captaining Leicester City F.C. to the 2015–16 Premier League title.

See also
 
 List of Puerto Rican rums

References

External links
 
 Captain Morgan official website
 Captain Morgan on thebar UK, owned by Diageo

Alcoholic drink brands
Cultural depictions of Henry Morgan
Diageo brands
Distilled drinks
Jamaican brands
Jamaican rum
Rums
Puerto Rican rums